Goose Feather is a 2004 Serbian film directed by Ljubiša Samardžić. Its original Serbian language title is Jesen stiže, Dunjo moja.

It was Serbia and Montenegro's submission to the 77th Academy Awards for the Academy Award for Best Foreign Language Film, but was not accepted as a nominee.

Cast 
 Branislav Trifunović - Sava Ladjarski
 Kalina Kovačević - Anica Granfild
 Marija Karan - Marija Stanimirovic
 Igor Đorđević - Kum Petrasin
 Marta Uzelac - Dunja
 Rada Đuričin - Savina majka 
 Vojislav Brajović - Savin otac 
 Predrag Ejdus - Gazda Granfild
 Renata Ulmanski - Gospodja Blavacki
 Slobodan Ninković - Timotije 
 Milorad Mandić - Skeledzija 
 Boris Milivojević - Ciganin
 Branimir Brstina - Vlasnik carde

See also

Cinema of Serbia
List of submissions to the 77th Academy Awards for Best Foreign Language Film

References

External links

2004 films
2000s Serbian-language films
2004 drama films
Serbian drama films
Films set in Vojvodina
Films shot in Serbia